Aprosodia is a neurological condition characterized by the inability of a person to properly convey or interpret emotional prosody. Prosody in language refers to the ranges of rhythm, pitch, stress, intonation, etc. These neurological deficits can be the result of damage of some form to the non-dominant hemisphere areas of language production. The prevalence of aprosodias in individuals is currently unknown, as testing for aprosodia secondary to other brain injury is only a recent occurrence.

Types

Productive
 Motor aprosodia is characterised by the physical inability of a patient to produce or imitate emotional indicators, with vocal inflection (volume and pitch changes) and facial gesturing being the most frequently impaired functions and with damage to the motor area of the brain being the most frequent cause of impairment. Persons exhibiting only a motor aprosodia are able to understand the affective aspects of others' spoken communication but are physically unable to respond in kind.
 Expressive aprosodia occurs when cognitive limitations rather than (or in addition to) motor-skill limitations render an individual unable to properly produce cues reflecting an intended emotional message. It is believed that expressive aprosodia, like cognitive varieties of the receptive aprosodia discussed below, results from deficiencies in one's emotional "database" (analogous to the combination of a dictionary translating cue to meaning with a reverse dictionary translating meaning to cue, the latter being at issue in expressive aprosodia) much as damage to the corresponding area of one's dominant brain hemisphere can diminish one's ability both to select the words that best convey one's intended first-order message and to identify the first-order message most likely conveyed by another's words.

Receptive
Receptive aprosodia can result from impairment at one or more sensory and/or cognitive levels ranging from hearing (signal acquisition) to auditory processing (signal isolation) to emotional comprehension (signal interpretation). For example, the first two difficulties impair an individual's ability to observe and discern changes in stress and intonation, whereas the third impairs an individual's ability to assess the significance of those stress and intonation changes that he or she correctly observes and discerns; impairment of the third type correlates significantly with expressive aprosodia.

Mixed
Mixed aprosodia is characterized by the exhibition of more than one of the above specific subtypes of aprosodia, with the degree of impairment exhibited by a given person often differing from subtype to subtype.

Presentation

Impact
The loss of ability to express and understand emotions is debilitating to those experiencing aprosodia. It has a large impact on their lives and affects their day-to-day interactions with others. While it is often overlooked, affective prosody is as integral to communication as the ability to form and understand correct words. Patients exhibiting extreme cases of aprosodia speak in a monotone fashion and are barely able or unable to distinguish changes in stress or intonation.

Causes

Localized brain damage
One cause of aprosodia is trauma to one of several specific areas of the brain, resulting in the inability to properly process or convey
emotional cues. This brain damage can occur in the form of ischemic damage from stroke, removal during surgery, brain lesions, or trauma such as a localized bullet wound. It is worth noting however, that this localization occurs over a range of areas that can vary from person to person and more research is required to further define these areas. Diagnostic confirmation of aprosodia using brain scanning techniques is a relatively recent occurrence, at least with respect to quantitative specificity. As brain imaging techniques are refined to allow for greater temporal and spatial resolution, it is hoped that more will be able to be learned about aprosodias at a functional anatomical level.

Alcohol use disorder
An inability to process or exhibit emotions in a proper manner has been shown to exist in people who consume excessive amounts of alcohol and those who were exposed to alcohol while fetuses (FAexp). Initially, when people with an alcohol use disorder are detoxified and FAexp individuals were tested for impairment in cognitive function, it was limited to testing the non-affective aspects of language, as those were the more easily recognized by a physician not trained in analyzing affective prosody. When tested using the aprosodia battery, it was found that those with alcohol use disorder who detoxified and FAexp individuals demonstrated significant impairment in their ability to detect affective prosody when used by others. The major factors which influence affective prosody in those impacted by alcohol use, from greatest to least impact, are: alcohol use by mother, age at onset of chronic abuse of alcohol, age at initial abuse, how chronic the abuse is, and the age when a person first becomes drunk.

Aprosodia as a symptom
Aprosodia has also been shown to appear secondary to several diseases such as multiple sclerosis or post traumatic stress disorder. It is likely that as time passes more diseases will be shown to exhibit aprosodia as a symptom. Aprosodia is a condition that was not often tested for in the presence of neurological deficits; however, as more becomes known about it, the aprosodia battery will likely be administered more frequently. For example, the first study testing for aprosodia in MS did not occur until 2009. This is surprising given that changes in emotional affect would be expected to be noticed in patients exhibiting other changes in speech patterns. This is especially so given that the patients tested in these studies scored poorer than the controls by a statistically significant amount.

Diagnosis

Emotional batteries
Emotional batteries consist of asking patients to read various sentences with specific emotional indicators. Their performance is subjectively analyzed by an expert to determine if they are aprosodic. The analysis is often performed by two experts independently, with one of the judges not being present during the interview in case the patient was still able to use facial cues.

Assessment questionnaire
Another method implemented to test for aprosodia involves having questionnaires filled out by those close to the patient. The doctors and nurses taking care of a patient are also requested to fill out a questionnaire if aprosodia is suspected. This diagnosis method occurs more as an indicator that the aprosodia battery should be administered rather than being used as a singular diagnosis tool. Implementation of the questionnaire is expected to become more widespread as aprosodia is revealed to be a side-effect of more diseases.

Aprosodia vs. dysprosody
Brain imaging studies related to speech functions have yielded insights into the subtle difference between aprosodia and dysprosody. The major differences in these result from functions which are characterized as belonging mainly to the left or right hemisphere. Several of the functions have been described as dominant and lateralized functions of the corresponding hemispheres, while some have been found to arise from communication between the two hemispheres. While the ability to express or be receptive to affective prosody is similar in dysprosody and aprosodia, a significant difference in the characterization of them is dominant vs. non-dominant hemispherical damage.

Treatment
Due to the rarity of reported aprosodia cases, only a few labs are currently researching treatment methods of aprosodia. The largest study of treatments for aprosodia consisted of only fourteen individuals, resulting in sample sizes too small to report statistical significance when comparing one treatment to another. However, the data gained from this study still yielded some results and is being used in the next iteration of aprosodia research.

Methods
The two main forms of treatment are cognition based and imitation based. Cognitive treatments attempt to rebuild the "emotional toolbox" of those with aprosodia. The basis for this treatment is the belief that there exists a defined set of emotional responses that can be chosen for a given scenario. Choosing the proper emotional response can very much be likened to choosing the proper word when describing an object, and this deficiency can be likened to Broca's Aphasia but for emotions. Imitative treatments attempt to help "kickstart" the motor systems involved in the production of both vocal and facial emotive gestures. The basis for this treatment is the belief that the pathways responsible for the motor elements of expressive prosody were damaged. It is hypothesized that the motor damage occurs at the level of planning as well as the level of execution.

Progress
The methods of treatment are being evaluated and changed through several iterations to reach the most beneficial treatment for those with aprosodia. Although the biggest limitation on progress of aprosodia treatment is sample size, some significant data has been found to influence each subsequent phase of study. The Rosenbek lab at the University of Florida is currently in a new phase of treatment study based on combinations of the cognitive-linguistic and imitative therapies delivered in a randomized fashion in an effort to gain more insight into what most prominently affects aprosodia treatment.

Research
Research into the perisylvan region of the right hemisphere has shown that there are similarly mapped analogues to the speech center in the left hemisphere. This is especially evident in those areas resembling Broca's area and Wernicke's area. The similarity of these regions has led scientists to view aprosodias in a similar manner to how some aphasias are viewed. Because the presence of an aphasia is often more pronounced in an individual than an aprosodia might be, aphasias have traditionally been more heavily studied. Because aphasias are rooted in deficiencies in language modalities rather than affective aspects of language, it has been easier to characterize the underlying impairment caused by brain damage (e.g. inability to choose the right word or inability to speak due to motor control). Combining aphasic research with right-left analogue mapping has allowed for researchers to produce hypotheses on the underlying process behind various aprosodias.

Additionally, in studying the brain regions associated with aprosodia, brain imaging tests were performed to determine if aprosodia is both a lateralized and dominant function of the right hemisphere areas of language production. Aprosodia can be considered a dominant function of the right hemisphere because strong correlation was found between deficits in affective prosody and distribution of lesions in the cortices of those with right brain damage. No correlation was found between the distribution of cortical lesions in patients with left brain damage and the types of aphasic deficits pronounced in those patients. Aprosodia can be considered a lateralized function of the right hemisphere because of the differences in the ability of a patient to respond to affective prosodic information in those with left brain damage when compared to those with right brain damage. Patients with affective-prosodic deficits in the left hemisphere (dysprosodic patients) showed improvement in understanding and repeating prosodic information when other conveyed linguistic information was simplified, i.e. requiring the patient to mainly determine prosodic information contained in an interaction. This improvement in processing affective prosodic information under reduced linguistic processing demands did not occur for patients with right brain damage.

See also 
 Affect
 Aphasia
 Dysprosody
 Lists of language disorders
 Prosody

References

Alcohol and health
Neurological disorders